Adam Pretty is a professional sports photographer from Sydney, Australia.

Pretty grew up in the eastern suburbs of Sydney and attended Sydney Boys High School where his interest in photography started and he developed his first skills in using a camera. After school Pretty worked as a freelance photographer and began his career by finally landing his first job with the Sydney Morning Herald in 1997. His desire to specialise in sport led to him joining Allsport (now Getty Images) in 1998, where he is still working.  Pretty was one of the key photographers for Getty Images during the 2000 Summer Olympics in Sydney, the 2002 Winter Olympics in Salt Lake City, 2004 Summer Olympics in Athens and the 2012 Olympic Games in London. He has also worked as a sports photographer in Los Angeles, United States. After a short stint in Europe, he returned to Sydney and then worked in China for several years. Adam is currently working and living in Germany.

Awards
 World Press Photo - Sports Portfolio
 1st Place Sports Stories/Portfolio 1999
 2nd Place Sports Stories Action stories 2003
 1st Place Sports Stories/Portfolio 2004
 2nd Place Sports Stories/Portfolio 2005
 1st Place Sports Stories/Portfolio 2011
 2nd Place Sports Stories/Portfolio 2012.
 SSF World Sports Photo Contest: Special Photographers Award
 Pictures of the Year International - Sports Portfolio
 1st Place Sports Portfolio 1998
 1st Place Sports Portfolio 1999
 1st Place Sports Portfolio 2000
 Walkley Award
 1st Place News Photograph 1998
 1st Place Sports Photography 2003
 1st Place Photo Essay 2004
 Press Photographer of the year 2004
 IOC Best of Sport: 1997 Silver Lens.
 2012 Canon AIPP Australian Professional Photographer of the Year

References

External links

Adam Pretty's homepage.
GettyImages Profile
Worldpressphoto Profile
orchardrepresents.com

Australian photographers
Year of birth missing (living people)
Living people
Sports photographers